Polynucleotide Phosphorylase (PNPase) is a bifunctional enzyme with a phosphorolytic 3' to 5' exoribonuclease activity and a 3'-terminal oligonucleotide polymerase activity. That is, it dismantles the RNA chain starting at the 3' end and working toward the 5' end. It also synthesizes long, highly heteropolymeric tails in vivo. It accounts for all of the observed residual polyadenylation in strains of Escherichia coli missing the normal polyadenylation enzyme. Discovered by Marianne Grunberg-Manago working in Severo Ochoa's lab in 1955, the RNA-polymerization activity of PNPase was initially believed to be responsible for DNA-dependent synthesis of messenger RNA, a notion that got disproved by the late 1950s.

It is involved in mRNA processing and degradation in bacteria, plants, and animals.

In humans, the enzyme is encoded by the  gene. In its active form, the protein forms a ring structure consisting of three PNPase molecules. Each PNPase molecule consists of two RNase PH domains, an S1 RNA binding domain and a K-homology domain. The protein is present in bacteria and in the chloroplasts and mitochondria of some eukaryotic cells. In eukaryotes and archaea, a structurally and evolutionary related complex exists, called the exosome complex.

The same abbreviation (PNPase) is also used for another, otherwise unrelated enzyme, Purine nucleoside phosphorylase.

Model organisms 

			
Model organisms have been used in the study of PNPT1 function. A conditional knockout mouse line, called Pnpt1tm1a(KOMP)Wtsi was generated as part of the International Knockout Mouse Consortium program — a high-throughput mutagenesis project to generate and distribute animal models of disease to interested scientists.

Male and female animals underwent a standardized phenotypic screen to determine the effects of deletion. Twenty six tests were carried out on mutant mice and two significant abnormalities were observed. No homozygous mutant embryos were identified during gestation, and therefore none survived until weaning. The remaining tests were carried out on heterozygous mutant adult mice; no additional significant abnormalities were observed in these animals.

References

External links 
 

Ribonucleases
EC 2.7.7
Genes mutated in mice
1955 in biology